Hranice may refer to places in the Czech Republic:

Hranice (České Budějovice District), a municipality and village in the South Bohemian Region
Hranice (Cheb District), a town in the Karlovy Vary Region
Hranice (Přerov District), a town in the Olomouc Region
Hranice Abyss, an abyss in Hranice
SK Hranice, a football club in Hranice